Mary Leunig (born 1950) is an Australian visual artist who has had work featured in such publications as The Age, Meanjin, Nation Review, Heat Magazine, AWU Magazine, Time, Penthouse, Der Rabe, and The Meatworkers Journal.

Life and career 
Mary Leunig grew up in Maidstone, Melbourne where she attended Footscray North State School and Maribyrnong High School. Leunig has two sisters, and her brother, Michael Leunig (born 1945), is also a popular and accomplished cartoonist and poet.

She began studying art at Prahran Institute of Technology, and later Preston Institute of Technology, where she completed her studies, majoring in drawing and printmaking. Her future husband was also a student at Prahran. 

Her cartoons are drawn in pen and watercolour with black lines and vibrant colours. Her work often includes political and feminist themes and usually contains elements that are humorous or confronting.

Personal life 
Leunig married Leon Norster (born 1950) and they have two children. She lives and works in Merton in the Strathbogie Ranges of Victoria.

Published work 
She has published five anthologies of work.

References 

1950 births
Living people
Cartoonists from Melbourne
Australian people of German descent
Australian women cartoonists
People from Footscray, Victoria